Intensive interaction is an approach for teaching communication skills to children and adults who have autism, severe learning difficulties and profound and multiple learning difficulties who are still at early stages of development. The approach focuses on teaching the fundamentals of communication – the communication concepts and performances that precede speech development, though it may include many people who have some speech and language development.

History 

Intensive interaction was developed by teachers Dave Hewett and Melanie Nind at Harperbury Hospital School in Southern England during the 1980s. The development of the approach came about partly as a result of practitioners questing for effective teaching approaches and partly as a reaction to and move away from the dominance of behavioural psychology in the field. A psychologist, the late Geraint Ephraim, working at Leavesden Mental Hospital, propounded the original formulation of techniques known then as "Augmented Mothering". This name was later changed to "Intensive Interaction" to make it clear that the approach is able to meet the needs of children and adults of any age. The detailed development work resulted in the first research projects and publications by Nind and Hewett.

The techniques of teaching borrow from understandings as to how infants in the first two years carry out the learning of these highly complicated, critical concepts and abilities. The mass of research on babies learning in interactions with adults that has arisen since the mid-1970s, allows some simple pedagogical insights. Babies gradually accrue these complex performances by taking part in many successive, cumulative interactions with the adults around them. The main learning motivation for both participants is the mutual enjoyment of the interaction. The natural adult style is to construct the interaction basically, mostly, by allowing the baby to lead with her behavior, with the adult building the content and a flow by responding to the behavior of the baby. It is usually observed that the most frequently seen adult response is to imitate what the baby does. Thus the teaching is highly responsive and by process, rather than directive and driving to an objective.

For the developers of intensive interaction, it seemed a logical step to borrow from these processes in order to ignite the communication learning of many people who can frequently be considered "communicatively difficult to reach", often living with some, or extensive, social isolation. Thus, intensive interaction activities are literally highly interactive, with the teacher enjoyably working from the behavior of the learner. The activities can operate at many levels of intensity; they can be active and physical, but also quietly intense and contemplative. For good progress to occur, the activities should happen frequently (daily, day after day), with the repetition of successful activities within sessions providing the basis for the gradual expanding in duration, content, sophistication and complexity of those activities.

The gradual dissemination of intensive interaction since the late 1980s has been a completely practitioner-led initiative. Intensive interaction is now common practice in special schools and adult services all over the United Kingdom. Interest worldwide is growing and developing. There are a range of books and other materials now available and a burgeoning community of intensive interaction practitioners.

Intended use 

Intensive interaction is intended to address the needs of:
 People who are pre-verbal, with few or limited communicative behaviours.
 People who are extremely socially withdrawn, and do not positively interact with other people.
 People who display various stereotyped or self-stimulatory behaviours that exclude the participation of other people.

The "fundamentals of communication" are typically referred to as being attainments such as:
 enjoying being with another person
 developing the ability to attend to that person
 concentration and attention span
 learning to do sequences of activity with the other person
 taking turns in exchanges of behaviour
 sharing personal space
 using and understanding eye contacts
 using and understanding facial expressions
 using and understanding physical contacts
 using and understanding non-verbal communication
 using vocalisations with meaning (for some, speech development)
 learning to regulate and control arousal levels

Further reading 

 Firth, G., Berry, R. & Irvine, C. (2010) Understanding Intensive Interaction: Context and Concepts for Professionals and Families. London: Jessica Kingsley Publishers.
 Firth, G. &  Barber, M. (2011) Using Intensive Interaction with a Person with a Social or Communicative Impairment. London: Jessica Kingsley Publishers.
 Hewett, D. (Ed) (2011) Intensive Interaction - Theoretical Perspectives. London: Sage Publications.
 Hewett, D., Firth, G., Barber, M. & Harrison, T. (2012) The Intensive Interaction Handbook. London: Sage Publications.
 Hewett, D. & Nind, M. (Eds) (1998) Interaction in Action: Reflections on the Use of Intensive Interaction. London: David Fulton.
 Kellett, M. & Nind, M. (2003) Implementing Intensive Interaction in Schools: Guidance for Practitioners, Managers and Coordinators. London: David Fulton.
 Nind, M. & Hewett, D. (2005) Access to Communication (2nd edition): Developing the basics of communication with people with severe learning difficulties through Intensive Interaction. London: David Fulton.

Additional published literature 

 Argyropoulou, Z. & Papoudi, D. (2012) ‘The training of a child with autism in a Greek preschool inclusive class through Intensive Interaction: a case study.’ European Journal of Special Needs Education, 27 (1), 99-114.
 Barber, M. (2008) ‘Using Intensive Interaction to add to the palette of interactive possibilities in teacher-pupil communication.’ European Journal of Special Needs Education, 23 (4), 393–402.
 Berry, R., Firth, G., Leeming, C. & Sharma, V. (2013) ‘Clinical Psychologists’ Views of Intensive Interaction as an Intervention in Learning Disability Services’, Clinical Psychology & Psychotherapy, 21 (5), 403–410.
 Elgie, S. & Maguire, N. (2001) 'Intensive Interaction with a Woman with Multiple and Profound Disabilities; a case study.’ Tizard Learning Disability Review, (6) 3, 18-24.
 Firth, G., Elford, H., Leeming, C., & Crabbe, M. (2008) ‘Intensive Interaction as a Novel Approach in Social Care: Care Staff’s Views on the Practice Change Process.’ Journal of Applied Research in Intellectual Disabilities, 21, 58–69.
 Fraser, C. (2011) ‘Can adults on the autism spectrum be affected positively by the use of intensive interaction in supported living services?’, Good Autism Practice, 12 (2), 37–42.
 Harris, C. & Wolverson, E. (2014) ‘Intensive Interaction: to build fulfilling relationships’, The Journal of Dementia Care, 22 (6), p. 27-30. 
 Hutchinson, N. & Bodicoat, A. (2015) ‘The Effectiveness of Intensive Interaction: A Systematic Literature Review’, Journal of Applied Research in Intellectual Disabilities, 28 (6), 437–454.
 Kellett, M. (2000) ‘Sam’s Story: Evaluating Intensive Interaction in Terms of its Effect on the Social and Communicative ability of a Young Child With Severe Learning Difficulties’, Support for Learning, 15 (4), 165–171.
 Kellett, M. (2005) ‘Catherine’s Legacy: social communication development for individuals with profound learning difficulties and fragile life expectancies.’ British Journal of Special Education, 32 (3), 116–121.
 Leaning, B. & Watson T. (2006) ‘From the inside looking out – an Intensive Interaction group for people with profound and multiple learning disabilities.’ British Journal of Learning Disabilities, 34, 103–109.
 Lovell, D., Jones, S. & Ephraim, G. (1998) ‘The Effect of Intensive Interaction on the Sociability of a Man with Severe Intellectual Disabilities.’ International Journal of Practical Approaches to Disability, 22 (2/3), 3–8.
 Nind, M. (1996) ‘Efficacy of Intensive Interaction; Developing sociability and communication in people with severe and complex learning difficulties using an approach based on caregiver- infant interaction.’ European Journal of Special Educational Needs, 11 (1), 48–66.
 Rayner, K., Bradley, S., Johnson, G., Mrozik, J., Appiah, A. & Nagra, M. (2016) ‘Teaching Intensive Interaction to paid carers: using the ‘communities of practice’ model to inform training’, British Journal of Learning Disabilities, 44 (1), 63–70.
 Samuel, J., Nind, M., Volans, A. & Scriven, I. (2008) ‘An evaluation of Intensive Interaction in community living settings for adults with profound intellectual disabilities.' Journal of Intellectual Disabilities, 12, 111-126.
 Sharma, V. & Firth, G. (2012) ‘Effective engagement through Intensive Interaction’, Learning Disability Practice, 15 (9), 20–23.
 Watson, J. & Fisher, A. (1997) ‘Evaluating the Effectiveness of Intensive Interaction Teaching with Pupils with Profound and Complex Learning Disabilities.’ British Journal of Special Education, 24 (2), 80–87.
 Watson, J. & Knight, C. (1991) ‘An Evaluation of Intensive Interactive Teaching with Pupils with Very Severe Learning Difficulties.’ Child Language Teaching and Therapy, 7 (3), 310–25.
 Zeedyk, S., Davies, C., Parry, S. & Caldwell, P. (2009) ‘Fostering social engagement in Romanian children with communicative impairments: The experiences of newly trained practitioners of Intensive Interaction.’ British Journal of Learning Disabilities, 37 (3), 186–196.
 Zeedyk, S., Caldwell, P. & Davies, C. (2009) ‘How rapidly does Intensive Interaction promote social engagement for adults with profound learning disabilities and communicative impairments?’ European Journal of Special Needs Education, 24 (2), 119–137.

References

External links 
 Intensive Interaction Institute, an organization for the advancement of intensive interaction

Learning methods
Treatment of autism